"Let Me Die in My Footsteps" is a song written by American singer-songwriter Bob Dylan in February 1962. The song was selected for the original sequence of Dylan's 1963 album The Freewheelin' Bob Dylan, but was replaced by "A Hard Rain's a-Gonna Fall". This version was recorded at Columbia studios on April 25, 1962, during the first Freewheelin'  session, and was subsequently released in March 1991 on The Bootleg Series Volumes 1–3 (Rare & Unreleased) 1961–1991.

A later version, recorded as a demo for M. Witmark & Sons publishing company in December 1962, was released in October 2010 on The Bootleg Series Vol. 9: The Witmark Demos: 1962–1964. The song's first release, however, was in September 1963 on The Broadside Ballads, Vol. 1, an album of topical songs compiled by folk musician Pete Seeger and Sis Cunningham, publisher of Broadside magazine. This version was recorded on January 24, 1963, with Dylan performing as "Blind Boy Grunt" (for contractual reasons), backed by his friend Happy Traum. Broadside had published the song's lyrics under its original title, "I Will Not Go Down Under the Ground", in the magazine's third issue in April 1962.

Background
In the booklet that accompanied The Bootleg Series Volumes 1–3, Todd Harvey wrote that "Let Me Die in My Footsteps" has no clear melodic precedent and suggests that this may be the first song for which Dylan created an original melody. However, Dylan later revealed the song's origins in Chronicles: Volume One, indicating it was based on an old Roy Acuff ballad. According to Dylan, the song was inspired by the construction of fallout shelters, a widespread practice in the U.S. during the Cold War political climate of the 1950s when he was growing up.

In 1963, Dylan gave this account of how he came to write "Let Me Die in My Footsteps" to critic Nat Hentoff, who wrote the liner notes for The Freewheelin' Bob Dylan:

The liner notes to Broadside Ballads, Vol. 1 included this comment on the song:

Footnotes

References

External links
 Lyrics on BobDylan.com

1962 songs
Bob Dylan songs
Songs about nuclear war and weapons
Songs written by Bob Dylan